Working equitation is an equestrian discipline. The world regulatory body is the World Association for Working Equitation.

The Working Equitation discipline is intended to promote competition between traditional styles of riding used during fieldwork in various countries, and also to act as a showcase for traditional riding costumes and equipment. Working Equitation became a competitive sport in 1996 along with its first European championship being held in Italy the same year. Working Equitation is recognised as a sport in many countries, mostly in South America and Europe, all countries have their own governing body of the sport. The sport tests the horse and rider's partnership and ability to manoeuvre obstacles. There are four different levels of Working Equitation: Novice, Intermediate, Junior and Advanced. At advanced level, the rider must ride with just one hand, most commonly their left hand, on the reins.

Competition events may be individual or for teams, and are in three or four parts, in this order:

 Dressage, in which the horse and rider perform obligatory movements in a freestyle dressage test to music within a specified time scale.
 Ease of Handling Trial, a gymkhana-type event in which horses must overcome obstacles similar to those likely to appear in the field, such as bridges and gates. The obstacle course is designed to show the partnership between horse and rider.
 Speed, where similar obstacles must be overcome, but against time
 Cow (only for team competitions), in which the four team members separate a specific numbered cow from a group.

The Team event at the 2010 European Working Equitation Championships was won by riders from Portugal.

World Championships

The first Working Equitation World Championship was held from 11–13 October 2002 at Beja, Portugal, with teams from Brazil, France, Italy, Mexico, Portugal, Spain and the United Kingdom. The team from Portugal won the team event, and the individual competition was won by Fabio Lombardo of Brazil on Brilho do Rimo with 100 points.

In the second Working Equitation World Championship in Lisbon from 26 to 29 October 2006, there were teams from France, Italy, Mexico, Portugal, Spain and the United Kingdom. The Portuguese team won the team event for the second time in a row and David Duarte Oliveira of Portugal won the individual event with his horse Mulato.

The third World Championship was held five years later, from 26–30 October 2011, in Lyon, France. There were six national teams and 25 individual riders from 8 different countries. The team from Portugal again won the team event, and Pedro Torres of Portugal won the individual event on Oxidado.

At the fourth World Championship, held at Ebreichsdorf in Austria from 5–8 June 2014, there were 28 individual entries from 10 different countries, but only four national teams. The Portuguese team again won the team event and the four members of the team took the first four places in the individual event, which was won by Bruno Pica da Conceição and Trinco.

References

Equestrian sports